The Technology and Innovation functional constituency is a functional constituency in the elections for the Legislative Council of Hong Kong first created in 2021, replacing the Information Technology functional constituency. The constituency has the fewest electorate among all constituencies, composing only 73 designated bodies relating to technology and innovation, including 25 national level research platforms, 11 public organisations, and 41 academic organisations and professional bodies participating in government's consultation on the development of innovation and technology, as compared to the 12,091 registered voters in the previous Information Technology constituency.

Return members

Electoral results

2020s

References

Constituencies of Hong Kong
Constituencies of Hong Kong Legislative Council
Functional constituencies (Hong Kong)
2021 establishments in Hong Kong
Constituencies established in 2021